
Year 483 BC was a year of the pre-Julian Roman calendar. At the time, it was known as the Year of the Consulship of Vibulanus and Potitus (or, less frequently, year 271 Ab urbe condita). The denomination 483 BC for this year has been used since the early medieval period, when the Anno Domini calendar era became the prevalent method in Europe for naming years.

Events 
 By place 

 Persian empire 
 Xerxes I of Persia is encouraged by his cousin and brother-in-law, Mardonius, supported by a strong party of exiled Greeks, to take revenge for the defeat that Darius I suffered at the hands of the Greeks at Marathon in 490 BC. In response, Xerxes prepares for a major expedition to crush the Greeks. To avoid a repeat of the significant losses to the Persian fleet that occurred in 492 BC, Xerxes has a canal cut through the promontory of Mount Athos.

 Greece 
 The Athenian archon Themistocles realises that the Greeks need to be able to beat the Persians at sea.  To carry out this strategy, however, Athens needs far more warships (that is to say the newly developed, specialised triremes) than the 70 it has. Themistocles is initially opposed by other Athenian leaders.  However, when the state-owned silver mines at Laurium become the site of a rich strike, Themistocles persuades the assembly, instead of "declaring a dividend," to devote the whole surplus to increasing the navy to a proposed 200 ships.

 India 
 Following the death of Gautama Buddha, the relics associated with his cremation were divided amongst royal families and his disciples, then interned in 8 reliquaries. Each reliquary was then encased in its own burial mound, called a stupa (approximate date).

 Sicily 
 Gelo, the tyrant of Syracuse conquers the nearby Sicilian cities of Euboea and Megara Hyblaea, selling their common people into slavery and bringing their oligarchs to Syracuse.

Rome 
 Commencement of the Fabian war with Veii.
 Ongoing hostilities with the Volsci.
 Punishment of the vestal virgin Oppia for a breach of chastity.

Births

Deaths 
 Gautama Buddha, Indian prince, founder of Buddhism (b. c. 563 BC)

References